Perumatty is a village in the Palakkad district, state of Kerala, India. It is among the villages administered by Perumatty gram panchayat.

Demographics
 India census, Perumatty had a population of 7,588 with 3,728 males and 3,860 females.
agriculture & Toddy tapping is the main revenue for the people in this panchayath. This panchayath is the first & leader in experimenting Hi-tech Agri techniques in Kerala State.Farmers society to promote Precision farming & various Agri related activities are conducted in this panchyath

Main Town
Vandithavalm Junction is in the main Town of this Panchayath

Educational institutions
Karuna Medical college & Hospital

Government HSS Kannimari

Government UP Nellimedu

Government HS Meenakshipuram

References

Villages in Palakkad district